is a professional basketball team playing in the B.League, the top-tier professional basketball league of Japan. The team is operated by the Human Group Sports Entertainment Company. The team is named after Ebisu. In July 2015 it was announced that the team will compete in the first division of the new Japan Professional Basketball League, which will commence from October 2016.

History
The team was formed in 2004 with the expansion of the bj league. They have been the most successful team in the league, having won three league championships in the league's first three seasons.

During the 2007-08 season, the team played their home games in seven separate arenas throughout the Osaka Prefecture and Hyogo Prefecture. This was also the first season that the team's game were broadcast live on television (for two games). The total attendance for their home games was 66,069, and the average attendance 3,003. The team finished in first place during the regular season and won the championship for the third consecutive season.

The 2008-09 season was the first season that the team did not use the Namihaya Dome for any of their home games.

COVID-19
13 Evessa players and trainer have tested positive for Coronavirus in April 2020.  Some other Osaka players may be infected.

Uniform
The team jersey colors are black and red. Under Armour is the current supplier of Evessa's uniforms.

The current uniform sponsors are:
Human Holdings Corporation (chest)
Abilit Corporation (back)
Life Creations Corporation (shorts)

Coaches
Kensaku Tennichi
Ryan Blackwell (2010–12)
Zoran Krečković (2012)
Takao Furuya（2012）
Bill Cartwright (2013)
Shunsuke Todo
Dai Oketani
Kensuke Hosaka
Kensaku Tennichi

Roster

Notable players

References

External links
  Official team web site

  bt dance team web site
  Osaka Prefectural Gymnasium web site
  Osaka Municipal Central Gymnasium web site

Basketball teams in Japan
Sports teams in Osaka
2004 establishments in Japan
Basketball teams established in 2004